Kassel is one of the three Regierungsbezirke of Hesse, Germany, located in the north of the state. It was created in 1866 when Prussia annexed the area to form the new province Hesse-Nassau. All together it consists of 138 municipalities.

Economy 
The Gross domestic product (GDP) of the region was 45.4 billion € in 2018, accounting for 1.4% of German economic output. GDP per capita adjusted for purchasing power was 34,200 € or 113% of the EU27 average in the same year. The GDP per employee was 96% of the EU average. This makes it one of the wealthiest regions in Germany and Europe.

References

External links

Government regions of Prussia
NUTS 2 statistical regions of the European Union
North Hesse
1866 establishments in Prussia
East Hesse
Government regions of Germany